Perković (also spelled Percovich and Perkovich) is a surname commonly found in Croatia. It is the 26th most common surname in the country. It may refer to:

Borimir Perković (born 1967), Croatian football manager
Dalibor Perković (born 1974), Croatian science fiction writer
John Perkovich (1924–2000), American baseball player
Josip Perković (born 1945), former agent of the Yugoslav State Security Service (SDB)
Korina Perkovic (born 1987), German tennis player
Leo Percovich, Uruguayan footballer
Luis Pércovich Roca (1931–2017), Prime Minister of Peru
Luka "Perkz" Perković (born 1998), Croatian professional gamer
Margarita Percovich (born 1941), Uruguayan politician
Mariana Percovich (born 1963), Uruguayan playwright, teacher, and theater director
Mile Perković (1921–2013), Yugoslav partisan, economist, and sports administrator
Marko Perković (born 1966), also known as Thompson, Croatian singer-songwriter
Nathan Perkovich (born 1985), American ice hockey player
Sandra Perković (born 1990), Croatian discus thrower
Vlado Perkovic (born 1969), Australian physician and researcher

See also
 Perković, Croatia, a village in Šibenik-Knin County

References

Croatian surnames
Patronymic surnames